Radek Štěpánek defeated James Blake 7–6(9–7), 5–7, 6–2 to win the 2007 Countrywide Classic singles event.

Kei Nishikori made his ATP main draw debut in this tournament. He lost in the first round.

Seeds

Draw

Finals

Section 1

Section 2

External links
Association of Tennis Professionals (ATP) draw
Association of Tennis Professionals (ATP) Qualifying draw

Singles